Roman Přikryl (born February 11, 1995) is a Czech professional ice hockey player. He is currently playing for HC Stadion Litoměřice of the Chance liga.

Přikryl made his Czech Extraliga debut playing with HC Plzeň during the 2014-15 Czech Extraliga season.

References

External links

1995 births
Living people
HC Plzeň players
Czech ice hockey forwards
Sportspeople from Plzeň